Kalmovka is a rural locality (a village) in Nikolayevsky Selsoviet, Karmaskalinsky District, Bashkortostan, Russia. The population was 30 as of 2010. There is 1 street.

Geography 
Kalmovka is located 11 km northeast of Karmaskaly (the district's administrative centre) by road. Savaleyevo is the nearest rural locality.

References 

Rural localities in Karmaskalinsky District